Ibrahim Juma Kivina (born 25 February 1958) is a Tanzanian long-distance runner. He competed in the men's 10,000 metres at the 1984 Summer Olympics.

References

1958 births
Living people
Athletes (track and field) at the 1984 Summer Olympics
Tanzanian male long-distance runners
Olympic athletes of Tanzania
Place of birth missing (living people)